Sean Byrne is an Australian filmmaker known for his films The Loved Ones (2009) and The Devil's Candy (2015).

For The Loved Ones, he won People's Choice Award, Midnight Madness Category, Toronto International Film Festival, and The Siren Award for Best International Feature, at the Lund International Film Festival.

References

External links

Living people
Year of birth missing (living people)
Horror film directors
Australian film directors
Australian screenwriters